Claude Dejoux (23 January 1732 – 18 October 1816) was a French sculptor.

Early years

Claude Dejoux was born on 23 January 1732 in Vadans, Jura.

Descended from the Counts of Joux, Claude Dejoux was born into a family of poor farmers. 
He started work as a shepherd, but was soon apprenticed to a carpenter due to his love of sculpture.
He was apprenticed to the sculptor Guillaume Coustou the Younger (1716–1777), where he met Pierre Julien (1731–1804).
He became a close friend of Julien.
Dejoux was accepted by the Academy in 1778, and in 1779 was named Academician.
He became sculptor to King Louis XVI of France.

Republic and empire

The French Revolution began in 1789.
In 1792 Dejoux was made an adjunct professor. 
In 1795 he became a member of the newly formed Institut de France. 
He was commissioned by the French First Republic to make a sculpture of Calinat, which is now held by the Louvre.
Dejoux was professor of David d'Angers, and supported him when he applied  for a scholarship from the town of Angers.

After Julien's death in 1804, Dejoux made a mausoleum ornamented with his portrait, which was erected in the garden of the Musée des monuments français.
In 1815 this monument was transported to the Père Lachaise Cemetery.
Dejoux was made a knight of the Legion of Honour.
In 1805–07 he made a bronze statue to General Louis Desaix.
The monument was erected in the Place des Victoires in 1810.
It was destroyed in 1814 during the Bourbon Restoration.

Claude Dejoux died on 18 October 1816 in Paris, aged 84.

Works
A partial list:
Saint Sébastien, marble statuette (1779), Paris, Louvre
Portrait of Marie-Christine Brignole, Princess of Monaco (1739–1813), terracotta bust (1783), Paris, Louvre
Statue that crowns the dome of the Pantheon, Paris
His sculptures for the facade of the Pavillon de Place des Victoires in Paris were destroyed during the Second French Empire. All that remains is a fragment of marble bas-relief of Charity (1788) 
His monument of General Desaix (1808) for the Place des Victoires in Paris was destroyed in 1814.

Pupils

Pupils included:
 David d'Angers (1788–1856) 
 Charles-René Laitié (1782–1862)
 François-Frédéric Lemot (1772–1827)
 Nicolas-Pierre Tiolier (1784–1853)

References

Sources

External links
 

1732 births
1816 deaths
18th-century French sculptors
French male sculptors
19th-century French sculptors
19th-century French male artists
18th-century French male artists